Palandur is a village in the Lakhani Taluka of Bhandara District of Maharashtra state in India. It is located 10 km from Dighori on National Highway 353C.

Villages in Bhandara district